Barbara Jordan (1936–1996) was an American politician and civil rights leader. Jordan has had a number of institutions and pieces of artwork named for her, including: 

Barbara Jordan Career Center
Barbara Jordan Health Policy Scholars
Barbara Jordan – Mickey Leland School of Public Affairs
Statue of Barbara Jordan (Austin–Bergstrom International Airport)
Statue of Barbara Jordan (University of Texas at Austin)

Barbara Jordan may also refer to: 
Barbara Jordan (poet) (born 1949), American poet
Barbara Jordan (tennis) (born 1957), American tennis player
Barbara Jordan (skier), Austrian para-alpine skier